WOLF (1490 kHz) is a sports formatted broadcast radio station licensed to Syracuse, New York, serving the Syracuse metropolitan area. The station is 100% owned by Craig Fox, who also owns several other radio and low-power TV stations in the state of New York. The WOLF broadcast license is held by WOLF Radio, Inc. The station is also simulcast on FM translator W223CP at 92.5 FM and WOSW (1300 AM) and W253BZ at 98.5 FM, Fulton, NY.

History
WOLF first signed on in Syracuse shortly after the start of World War II. Like all local-channel AMs, it was initially limited to only 250 watts of power. During the early 1960s it was permitted to raise daytime power to 1,000 watts, and increased night power to 1,000 watts a decade later along with nearly all other local-channel (Class C) AM stations in the United States. It long programmed a personality popular music format, and for many years was highly competitive within its signal area with stronger regional (Class B) signals from similarly formatted stations including WNDR and WFBL, although it was unable to achieve full metropolitan coverage especially after sunset.

Past radio personalities at WOLF include:
 Dick Clark
 Jim Sims
 Fred Winston (Chicago)
 Bud Ballou and Dale Dorman (Buffalo, Boston)
 Marv Albert and Don Bombard (New York City)
 Wendell "Windy" Craig (CBS Evening News)

On May 3, 1999, WOLF (alongside WOLF-FM and WKGJ) became the Radio Disney affiliates in the Syracuse metropolitan area. In June 2001, WBGJ started the simulcast of WOLF. On November 25, 2006, WAMF also started the simulcast of WOLF as result of the sale of the station to Craig Fox; although in October, the WAMF callsign was heard in the ID of Radio Disney stations in Syracuse.

In December 2006, the FM stations split off and flipped to the MOViN format. In September 2012, WAMF (now WOSW) dropped Radio Disney and flipped to Country.

In December 2013, WMBO dropped the WOLF simulcast and flipped to all-Beatles programming. On February 1, 2014, Radio Disney (as part of its phaseout of terrestrial broadcasting) canceled its affiliation with WOLF. WOLF was the last Radio Disney station not owned by the ABC, Inc. subsidiary of The Walt Disney Company. This resulted in the station going off-the-air as it transitioned to a new format, originally slated according to FCC filings to happen in August 2014.

At the time, a construction permit was filed for a new FM translator at 93.9 FM by Pathway Community Radio, Inc. to simulcast WOLF.  However, this was never completed.

WOLF was still silent in January 2015. As a result, the station temporarily signed on with a simulcast of WNDR-FM to keep the station's license active.

On July 20, 2015, the station flipped to sports as the Fox Sports Radio affiliate on the area. The station broadcasts the national network lineup. Fox Sports Radio had previously been heard in the area on network owned-and-operated WHEN until late 2010.

In May 2017, the station began simulcasting on FM translator W223CP at 92.5 FM.

References

External links

The WOLF 1490 Tribute Site

FCC History Cards for WOLF

OLF
Radio stations established in 1940
Sports radio stations in the United States
Fox Sports Radio stations